The Château de Tardes is a converted castle in the commune of Saint-Macaire in the Gironde département of France.

It was built between the 13th and 14th centuries as a medieval stronghold, but was converted in the 16th century to a Renaissance-style mansion, with the addition of mullions and a troubadour-style hexagonal tower with a spiral staircase.

The building is not open to the public. It was classified as a monument historique for its tower and well by the French Ministry of Culture on 21 October 1997.

Gallery

See also
List of castles in France

References

External links
 

Castles in Nouvelle-Aquitaine
Tardes
Monuments historiques of Gironde